Franklin L. Lavin (born October 26, 1957) is a former Republican White House aide who was the political director for Ronald Reagan between 1987 and 1989, a United States diplomat, U.S. naval officer, and a bank executive.

Early life and education 
Lavin is from Ohio and earned a B.S. from the School of Foreign Service at Georgetown University; a M.S. in Chinese language from Georgetown University; a M.A. in International Relations and International Economics from the School of Advanced International Studies at the Johns Hopkins University; and a MBA in Finance at the Wharton School at the University of Pennsylvania.

Career 
As Under Secretary of Commerce for International Trade, Lavin headed the International Trade Administration for the United States Department of Commerce from 2005 until 2007.

From August 2001 to 2005, Lavin served as the United States Ambassador to Singapore.

As of September 2001, Lavin is an officer in the United States Navy's reserve.

A 2005 report by the Office of the Inspector General of the Department of State praised Lavin's leadership in this position, calling him "a strong leader with a high degree of intellectual curiosity who wants to be kept well-briefed by all agencies, and yet lets people do their jobs without micromanaging".

Since 2010, Lavin has served as CEO of Export Now, a company dedicated to helping consumer brands sell their products in China.

In August 2016, Lavin endorsed Democratic candidate Hillary Clinton in the 2016 presidential election.

Personal life 
Frank Lavin and his wife Ann (née Wortley) have been married since November 29, 1980. They have three children. His father was a soldier in World War II.

Selected publications 
Lavin, Frank, and Henry Kissinger. Home Front to Battlefront: An Ohio Teenager in World War II. Athens, OH: Ohio University Press, 2017.

References

Political Service

 
 

|-

1957 births
Ambassadors of the United States to Singapore
Walsh School of Foreign Service alumni
Living people
Paul H. Nitze School of Advanced International Studies alumni
People from Canton, Ohio
Wharton School of the University of Pennsylvania alumni
Pennsylvania Republicans
United States Navy reservists
Under Secretaries of Commerce for International Trade